Margus Leivo (28 May 1954, in Räpina – 21 August 2019) was an Estonian politician. He was a member of X Riigikogu. He was the Estonian Minister of the Interior from 2003-2005.

He was a member of the People's Union of Estonia party.

References

1954 births
2019 deaths
People's Union of Estonia politicians
Members of the Riigikogu, 2003–2007
Ministers of the Interior of Estonia
Recipients of the Order of the National Coat of Arms, 2nd Class
Recipients of the Order of the National Coat of Arms, 4th Class
Tallinn University of Technology alumni
People from Räpina
Burials at Metsakalmistu